Callaghan is a suburb of Newcastle, New South Wales, Australia  from Newcastle's central business district. It contains the main campus of the University of Newcastle, which is the entirety of the suburb. It is served by Warabrook railway station on NSW TrainLink's Hunter Line.

Callaghan borders the suburbs of Shortland, Waratah West, and Warabrook.

History 
The Aboriginal people in this area, the Awabakal, were the first people of this land.

The suburb was named after Sir Bede Callaghan (1912–1993), who was Chancellor of the University of Newcastle from 1977 to 1988.

Callaghan had a population of 1,326 in 2016.

Places 
The Forum Sports and Aquatic Centre is located within the University of Newcastle and includes a number of sporting facilities – a heated indoor pool, five outdoor ovals and a gymnasium. It opened to general members of the public.

References

Suburbs of Newcastle, New South Wales